The 1989 USSR Federation Cup was the fourth edition of the USSR Federation Cup and was officially known as Cup of the USSR Football Union. It took place between 26 February to 5 November. Its final was played at Meteor Stadium in Dnepropetrovsk.

Group stage

Group A

Group B

Group C

Group D

Knock-out stage

Semifinals

Semifinals

Final

Top scorers

5 goals
 Mikhail Markhel (Dinamo Minsk)
 Syarhey Herasimets (Dinamo Minsk)

References

External links 
 1989 season at FootballFacts.ru

1990
1990 in Soviet football
FC Dnipro matches
FC Dinamo Minsk matches